Millerettidae is an extinct family of parareptiles from the Middle Permian to the Late Permian period (Capitanian - Changhsingian stages) of South Africa. The millerettids were small insectivores and probably resembled modern lizards in appearance and lifestyle.

The following cladogram shows the phylogenetic position of the Millerettidae, from Ruta et al., 2011.

References

External links
Berkeley University information.

Permian reptiles
Prehistoric reptiles of Africa
Guadalupian first appearances
Lopingian extinctions
Prehistoric reptile families
Parareptiles